Manchu Empire may refer to:

Qing dynasty (大清帝國), 1644–1912; the last imperial dynasty of China
Manchukuo (大滿洲帝國), 1932–1945; Japanese puppet kingdom